Susie Maxwell Berning (born July 22, 1941) is a retired American professional golfer. She became a member of the LPGA Tour in 1964 and won four major championships and eleven LPGA Tour victories in all. She also competed under her maiden name Susie Maxwell from 1964 to 1968. She was inducted into the World Golf Hall of Fame in 2022.

Amateur career
Maxwell was born in Pasadena, California. Her family moved to Oklahoma City, Oklahoma when she was 13. After taking up golf at the age of 15, she immediately won three-straight Oklahoma State High School Championships. She also won the Oklahoma City Women's Amateur from 1959 to 1961. In 1963, she won the Oklahoma Women's Amateur. She was the first woman to receive a golf scholarship from Oklahoma City University, where she competed on the men's team and she was a member of the Alpha Phi sorority.

Professional career
She turned pro and joined the LPGA Tour in 1964, and earned LPGA Rookie of the Year honors. She won her first tournament in 1965 at the Muskogee Civitan Open. She was named Most Improved Player for 1967. She won 11 times on the Tour, a high proportion of her wins coming in major championships, the 1965 Women's Western Open and the U.S. Women's Open in 1968, 1972 and 1973. However her form was inconsistent from her late twenties on, with the last of her three top-10 finishes on the money list coming in 1969. She stayed on the Tour for many years, though she did not always play full-time, and played 13 events as late as 1995. She made her final appearance on the Tour in 1996.

Since retiring from tour play, Berning has become a well-respected teaching professional spending time at the Nicholas-Flick Golf Academy, and now dividing her time between The Reserve Club in Palm Springs, California and Maroon Creek Country Club in Aspen, Colorado. She has two daughters, Robin Doctor and Cindy Molchany.

Professional wins (13)

LPGA Tour wins (11)

LPGA Tour playoff record (1–1)

Other wins (2)
1975 Lady Keystone Open
1997 Sprint Senior Challenge

Major championships

Wins (4)

See also
List of golfers with most LPGA Tour wins
List of golfers with most LPGA major championship wins

References

External links

Susie Maxwell Berning bio at GolfCompendium.com
Encyclopedia of Oklahoma History and Culture – Berning, Susie Maxwell

American female golfers
LPGA Tour golfers
Winners of LPGA major golf championships
World Golf Hall of Fame inductees
Golfers from California
Oklahoma City Stars athletes
Sportspeople from Pasadena, California
Sportspeople from Aspen, Colorado
Sportspeople from Palm Springs, California
1941 births
Living people
21st-century American women